N-Phenacylthiazolium bromide (PTB) is a cross-link breaker that in one study has been shown to prevent vascular advanced glycation end-product accumulation in diabetic rats.

References

Bromides
Thiazoles